City of Industry is a city in Los Angeles County, California.

City of Industry may also refer to:

 City of Industry (film), a 1997 crime film directed by John Irvin
 City of Industry (car), a name of two gassers in the 1950s and '60s

See also
 Industry City (also Bush Terminal) is an intermodal shipping, warehousing, and manufacturing complex in Brooklyn, New York City
 South San Francisco, California, a city in the San Francisco Bay Area known as "The Industrial City"